Mount Gravatt State High School is a co-educational government secondary school of about 1200 students in Mount Gravatt, a suburb in the south of Brisbane, Australia. The school was opened in 1960.

Mount Gravatt State High School is a Registered Training Organization (RTO) and is able to issue Australian Qualification Framework qualifications in the vocational education and training vector and to deliver and/or assess associated training.

The school is an Education Queensland International (EQI) pioneer school for International student programs.

Gateway school
The school is part of the Information and Communication Technology (ICT) Industry Project. As such it can be officially blended (along with five other schools) as ‘Gateway Schools to the ICT Industry’. Schools involved in this project are committed to increasing and improving the various and range of technology in learning. Students are encouraged to develop their learning and stills through the application of appropriate technology in education, as in many other schools.

Notable alumni 
Daniel Beale, member of Australian Kookaburras Men's field hockey team during gold medal-winning campaigns of the 2014 Commonwealth Games & 2018 Commonwealth Games.
Ross Clark, Australian poet
Erika Yamasaki – member of Australian weightlifting team at 2006 Commonwealth Games.

Awards
Comalco – Brisbane's greenest and healthiest school 2005.

References

Official school website

See also 
List of schools in Queensland
Education in Australia

Public high schools in Brisbane
Educational institutions established in 1960
1960 establishments in Australia